HMS Chevron was a  destroyer of the Royal Navy that was in service from August 1945 to the 1960s. She was scrapped in 1969.

Construction
The Royal Navy ordered Chevron on 24 July 1942, one of eight Ch-class "Intermediate" destroyers of the 1942 Programme. She was laid down at Alexander Stephen and Sons, Limited, Glasgow, Scotland, on 18 March 1943, and launched 23 February 1944. She was commissioned on 23 August 1945, too late for World War II. Her first captain was Lt.Cdr. John Fitzroy Duyland Bush, DSC, RN, from 19 January 1945. The yard also built her sister ship, .

Service
After the War Chevron was allocated the pennant number D51. On 9 December 1946, as part of the 'Palestine Patrol', tasked with intercepting illegal Jewish immigration to Mandatory Palestine, Chevron and the minesweeper  arrived at the small island of Syrna in the Dodecanese group of Greek islands, to rescue survivors of the coal-fired, ~650 gross tonne Athina Rafiah, carrying Jewish immigrants, which had wrecked on 7 December in Agiou Soassin Bay, on the south coast, while seeking shelter in heavy weather. Most of the approximately 800 Ma'apilim on board had struggled onto the island, some with injuries. "After dark, in heavy rain and a rough sea, they carried out the rescue operation and transported the miserable passengers to a landing ship tank (LST) near the island of Crete. Like thousands of Ma'apilim before them on board nine ships that sailed during the summer of 1946, the Ma'apilim were transported to detention camps in Cyprus."

On 6 February 1952, the U.S. Navy Martin P4M-1Q Mercator, BuNo 124371, based in Port Lyautey, French Morocco, staging out of Nicosia, Cyprus, returning from an electronic reconnaissance mission over the Black Sea, made an open ocean dead-stick landing east of Cyprus. Of 15 crew aboard, 14 were rescued by Chevron, the aircraft commander being lost following the ditching.

On 31 October 1954, the aircraft carrier  and Chevron were open to Malta visitors in the afternoon. Triumph was berthed in Grand Harbour and Chevron in Sliema Creek.

Decommissioning and reserve
In 1954 Chevron returned to Portsmouth from the Mediterranean and decommissioned.  In 1956 she was briefly recommissioned and served as part of the 1st Destroyer Squadron in Operation Musketeer during the Suez Crisis.  From 1957 until 1969 she served in reserve as an accommodation ship at Rosyth. Jane's Fighting Ships 1962-1963 states that "Chequers and Chevron are for disposal in the near future." She was placed on the disposal list in 1964.

Chevron was sold to Thos. W. Ward for scrapping at Inverkeithing in December 1969.  Her bell is preserved at the Collingwood Area School, New Zealand.

References

Publications
 
 
 
 

 

C-class destroyers (1943) of the Royal Navy
Ships built on the River Clyde
1944 ships
World War II destroyers of the United Kingdom
Cold War destroyers of the United Kingdom
Korean War destroyers of the United Kingdom